Christianity is a minority religion in Jiangsu province of China. Elsewhere in China, Christians are found in significant numbers in Henan, in Anhui and in Shandong.

The number of Christians in Jiangsu has been estimated at 125,000 for 1985, at 250,000 for 1988, at 400,000 for 1989, at 640,000 for 1991 and at 900,000 for 1995 according to Religious Affairs Bureau of Jiangsu Province. These figures possibly are underestimates. The country has persecution of Christians.

Amity Foundation, its general secretary being Qiu Zhonghui, has its seat in Nanjing.

History
Presence of Christians in Jiangsu has been attested as early as the 14th century (see Katarina Vilioni), but when the Jesuit missionaries reached the province in  the late 16th century, they were not able to find any Christians there. Matteo Ricci himself was based in Nanjing for a while, and since then the province had a significant missionary presence, not always entirely welcome by the local population (see e.g. the Yangzhou riot of 1868).

During the Taiping Rebellion, Jiangsu was partly controlled by the rebels, who established their capital in Nanjing, and whose ideology was significantly influenced by Christianity.

Roman Catholic dioceses with seat in Jiangsu 
Roman Catholic Archdiocese of Nanking
Roman Catholic Diocese of Haimen
Roman Catholic Diocese of Suzhou
Roman Catholic Diocese of Xuzhou

See also 

Spirit Church
 Christianity in Jiangsu's neighbouring provinces
 Christianity in Anhui
 Christianity in Shandong
 Christianity in Shanghai
 Christianity in Zhejiang
:zh:Category:江苏基督教 (The corresponding Category in Chinese Wikipedia)

References

Religion in Jiangsu
Christianity in China by location